ESRO-2B or Iris (International Radiation Investigation Satellite; sometimes Iris 2) or sometimes ESRO II (or ESRO 2), was a European astrophysical spin-stabilised research satellite which was launched in 1968. Operated by the European Space Research Organisation, ESRO 2B made astronomical surveys primarily in x-ray and solar particles detectors.

Spacecraft 

ESRO-2B was an  cylindrical spacecraft with a length of 85 cm and a diameter of 76 cm. On 10 December 1968 (approx 195 days since mission start) the on-board tape recorder suffered a mechanical failure. This effectively ended the two X-ray experiments as they did not provide any significant data return from then on. Other experiments could still be operated through ground radio links.

ESRO-2B was launched on a Scout B rocket into a highly elliptical near-polar orbit on 17 May 1968. Its predecessor satellite, ESRO-2A (sometimes Iris 1) failed to reach orbit on 29 May 1967, launching on a Scout B rocket from Vandenberg AFB SLC-5. The cause of failure was malfunction of the third stage of the rocket, preventing the satellite from reaching orbit. ESRO-2A was similar to ESRO-2B except it weighed a little less (74 kg).

Spin-stabilised, ESRO-2B had a spin rate of approximately 40 rpm and re-entered Earth's atmosphere on 8 May 1971 after completing 16,282 orbits.

Instruments 

Seven instruments were carried aboard EROS 2B designed to detect high energy cosmic rays, determine the total flux of solar X-rays and to measure Van Allen belt protons and cosmic ray protons. While designed for solar observations ESRO-2B is credited with the detection of X-rays from non-solar sources. The instruments were:

 Monitor of Energetic Particle Flux
 Solar and Van Allen Belt Protons
 Solar and Galactic Alpha Particles and Protons
 Primary Cosmic Ray Electrons
 Hard Solar X-rays
 Soft Solar X-rays
 Flux and Energy Spectra of Solar and Galactic Cosmic Ray Particles

References 

1972 in spaceflight
European Space Agency satellites